Lanoe or Lanoë may refer to:

Lanoe Hawker (1890–1916), the first British First World War flying ace and a Victoria Cross recipient
Lanoe Falconer, pseudonym of English writer Mary Elizabeth Hawker (1848–1908)
Annick Lanoë (born 1948), French film director, screenwriter and author

See also
Guillemette Andreu-Lanoë (born 1948), French Egyptologist and archaeologist